Margency is a commune in the Val-d'Oise department and Île-de-France region of France.

The composer Victor Serventi died in Margency on 16 March 2000.

See also 
Communes of the Val-d'Oise department

References

External links 
Official website 

Association of Mayors of the Val d'Oise 

Communes of Val-d'Oise